The Department of the Environment and Energy (DEE) was an Australian government department in existence between 2016 and 2020.

The department was responsible for matters including environment protection and conservation of biodiversity as well as energy policy. It was established in July 2016 by the Turnbull Government after the 2016 federal election.
Following the appointment of Scott Morrison as Prime Minister, Josh Frydenberg was elevated to Treasurer of Australia, whereby Frydenberg's previous ministerial positions were separated, with Melissa Price as Minister of the Environment and Angus Taylor as Minister for Energy. Price was reshuffled from her position in 2019, and was replaced by Sussan Ley.

By an administrative order issued on 5 December 2019 and effective from 1 February 2020, the environment functions of the  department were merged with all functions of the Department of Agriculture, to form the Department of Agriculture, Water and the Environment. The department's energy functions were transferred to the Department of Industry, Science, Energy and Resources.

Scope
The Administrative Arrangements Orders listed the department's responsibilities as follows:

Administration of the Australian Antarctic Territory, and the Territory of Heard Island and McDonald Islands
Air quality
Climate change adaptation strategy and co-ordination
Community and household climate action
Co-ordination of climate change science activities
Co-ordination of sustainable communities policy
Development and co-ordination of domestic climate change policy
Energy efficiency
Energy policy
Environment protection and conservation of biodiversity
Environmental information and research
Environmental water use and resources relating to the Commonwealth Environmental Water Holder
Greenhouse emissions and energy consumption reporting
Greenhouse gas abatement programs
Industrial energy efficiency
Ionospheric prediction
Land contamination
Meteorology
National energy market, including electricity and gas
National fuel quality standards
Natural, built and cultural heritage
Renewable energy
Renewable energy target policy, regulation and co-ordination
Renewable energy technology development
Urban environment

Structure
The head of the department was its Secretary, Finn Pratt , responsible to the Minister for the Environment and Energy, the Hon. Melissa Price  until 2019, and then the Hon. Sussan Ley . The department was staffed by individuals from the Australian Public Service.

Online databases and apps
, the DEE website also hosted the Australasian Underwater Cultural Heritage Database (AUCHD), a searchable online database containing data about shipwrecks, aircraft and other cultural heritage artefacts which are or have been underwater. The AUCHD also served as the register of protected underwater cultural heritage for the Underwater Cultural Heritage Act 2018 (the UCH Act), providing a means whereby the public could submit notifications and permit applications required under the Act.

The website also hosted a number of other databases and applications in the areas of biodiversity, climate change, heritage, the Environment Protection and Biodiversity Conservation Act 1999 (EPBC Act), environmental protection, land and water, as well as photo galleries of Australian plants, and environmental and cultural heritage subjects.

See also
Director of National Parks
Parks Australia
Great Barrier Reef Marine Park Authority
Waste management in Australia

References

External links

Environment and Energy
Environment and Energy
2016 establishments in Australia
Ministries disestablished in 2020
2020 disestablishments in Australia
Environment of Australia
Energy in Australia